Saint-Étienne–Bouthéon Airport or Aéroport de Saint-Étienne–Bouthéon  is an international airport serving the French city of Saint-Étienne.  It is located in Andrézieux-Bouthéon, 12 km north-northwest of Saint-Étienne, within the département of Loire in the Rhône-Alpes région and mainly used by low-cost airlines. 

In February 2017, the airport decided to cancel all subsidies towards low cost carriers serving the airport which led to Ryanair and Pegasus Airlines cancelling all services to Saint-Étienne by 2018. As of April 2018, the airport website mentions no scheduled services, but there are holiday charters, mainly to Mediterranean destinations.

Statistics

References

External links 

Saint-Étienne Bouthéon Airport (official site) 
Aéroport de Saint-Etienne – Bouthéon (Union des Aéroports Français) 

Airports in Auvergne-Rhône-Alpes
Buildings and structures in Loire (department)
Transport in Saint-Étienne